Heibao may refer to:

Heibao (band), or Black Panther, a seminal Chinese rock band founded in 1987
Heibao (album), 1992 debut album of the band Heibao
Heibao (company), a Chinese automotive manufacturing company based in Weihai, Shandong